Peter Salem (October 1, 1750 – August 16, 1816) was an African-American from Massachusetts who served as a U.S. soldier in the American Revolutionary War. Born into slavery in Framingham, he was freed by a later master, Major Lawson Buckminster, to serve in the local militia. He then enlisted in the Continental Army, serving for nearly five years during the war. Afterwards, he married and worked as a cane weaver. A monument was erected to him in the late 19th century at his grave in Framingham.

Early life
Peter Salem was born on October 1, 1750, to an enslaved mother in Framingham, Province of Massachusetts Bay. His enslaver was Jeremiah Belknap, who later sold him to Major Lawson Buckminster. When Buckminster became a major in the Continental Army, he emancipated Salem in 1775 so he could enlist in the Massachusetts militia in what soon became the Revolutionary War.

Salem's last name may have been given to him by his original enslaver Belknap, who may have chosen the name after Salem, Massachusetts, where he once lived. His last name may also be derived from the Arabic word "salaam", meaning peace.

Military service
Salem took part in the war's first battles at Concord on April 19, 1775. He is on the roll of Captain Simon Edgell's militia company from Framingham as having served four days from April 19, 1775. On April 24, he enlisted in Captain Drury's company of Colonel John Nixon's 6th Massachusetts Regiment.

Battle of Bunker Hill
Salem, another hero of this event, fought with his company in the Battle of Bunker Hill. According to Samuel Swett, who chronicled the battle, Salem had mortally wounded Royal Marines officer John Pitcairn who died from a musket shot. This has been disputed. About a dozen other free African Americans took part in the battle, including Phillip Abbot of Andover Mass, Barzillai Lew, Salem Poor, Titus Coburn, Alexander Ames, Cato Howe, and Seymour Burr.

Salem reenlisted for another year in the 4th Continental Regiment on January 1, 1776. When that enlistment expired, he signed up for three years in the 6th Massachusetts Regiment of Colonel Thomas Nixon, a brother of Colonel John Nixon. He was honorably discharged on December 31, 1779, having served a total of four years and eight months.

Salem apparently extended his enlistment for two months and served with Captain Claye's Company of Colonel Nixon's Regiment from January 1 to March 1, 1780.

Salem fought at the battles of Saratoga and Stony Point.

Later life and death
Salem spent the rest of his life living peacefully. He married Katy Benson in Salem, Massachusetts in September 1783, and he later built a cabin near Leicester, where he worked as a cane weaver.

Peter Salem died on August 16, 1816, aged 65. He was buried in the Old Burying Ground in Framingham, and the town spent $150 to erect a monument in his memory in 1882.

Media portrayals
At one time Salem was thought to have been depicted in John Trumbull's painting The Death of General Warren at the Battle of Bunker's Hill, June 17, 1775. Modern authorities differ. David Barton identifies Salem standing to Thomas Grosvenor's right.
Professor David Brion Davis, citing evidence from Professor Sidney Kaplan, states that the African American to Thomas Grosvenor's right "was Peter Salem".

Peter Salem is one of the supporting characters in the 2015 television miniseries Sons of Liberty. He is played by British actor Jimmy Akingbola.

References

Sources

"Peter Salem", Celebrate Boston website, article about role in Battle of Bunker Hill
"Peter Salem", African American Registry
Identifying the Soldier Named “Salem”, Boston 1775 blog

External links
 

1750 births
1816 deaths
18th-century American slaves
People from Leicester, Massachusetts
People from Framingham, Massachusetts
African-American history of Massachusetts
Black Patriots
Free people of color